Warberg Innebandyclub (often referred to as Warberg IC or WIC) is a Swedish floorball team, and one of the most successful teams in Swedish floorball history. Warberg has won four Swedish Championships, the last won in April 2008.

Current roster

''As of May 24, 2008

External links
 Official homepage
 iPhone App

Sports teams in Sweden
Swedish floorball teams
1985 establishments in Sweden
Sports clubs established in 1985
Sport in Halland County